Nepenthes infauna are the organisms that inhabit the pitchers of Nepenthes plants.  These include fly and midge larvae, spiders, mites, ants, and even a species of crab, Geosesarma malayanum.  The most common and conspicuous predators found in pitchers are mosquito larvae, which consume large numbers of other larvae during their development.  Many of these animals are so specialised that they cannot survive anywhere else, and are referred to as nepenthebionts.

The complex relationships between these various organisms are not yet fully understood.  The question of whether infaunal animals "steal" food from their hosts, or whether they are involved in a mutually beneficial (symbiotic) association has yet to be investigated experimentally and is the source of considerable debate. Charles Clarke suggests that mutualism is a "likely situation", whereby "the infauna receives domicile, protection and food from the plant, while in return, the infauna helps to break down the prey, increase the rate of digestion and keep bacterial numbers low".

Classification

Nepenthebionts
Nepenthebionts are animals which are specialised to live inside Nepenthes pitchers and are totally dependent on them at least at some stage of their lives.  Many species of mosquito larvae fall into this category. Examples include Culex rajah and Toxorhynchites rajah, which are named after Nepenthes rajah, as well as the related species Culex jenseni and Uranotaenia moultoni.

Nepenthephiles
Nepenthephiles are organisms that are frequently found in Nepenthes pitchers, but which are not completely dependent on them at any stage of their lives.  Most animals that coexist with Nepenthes fall into this category. Examples include Misumenops nepenthicola, a crab spider that feeds on flies caught by Nepenthes, and Geosesarma malayanum, a species of crab.

Nepenthexenes
Nepenthexenes are animals which are not normally associated with pitchers, but which are occasionally encountered in them. These are usually found if a pitcher becomes overloaded with putrefying prey, when it may be colonised by the larvae of various fly species.  These simply feed on rotting matter regardless of whether it is found in pitchers.

Diversity
In a 1991 study, a wide diversity of animals was found in pitchers of Nepenthes ampullaria:

Carrion feeders:
 Endonepenthia (Phoridae)
 Syrphidae

Filter feeders:
 Aedes albopictus, Culex coerulescens, Culex hewitti, Culex navalis, Tripteroides nepenthis, Tripteroides tenax, Uranotaenia moultoni (Culicidae)
 
Detritus feeders:
 several Anoetidae
 Dasyhelea, Forcipomyia (Ceratopogonidae)
 several Chironomidae
 Harpacticoida
 Sciaridae

Nipping predators (can swim in the fluid, mandibles move against one another in a horizontal plane):
 Aedes brevitibia, Toxorhynchites indicus (Culicidae)
 Corethrella calathicola (Chaoboridae)

Hooking predators (can only crawl, mandibles move parallel to one another in a vertical plane):
 Dolichopodidae
 Listodiplosis (Cecidomyiidae)
 Nepenthosyrphus (Syrphidae)

Terrestrial predators:
 Misumenops (Thomisidae)
 Xenoplatyura (Mycetophilidae)

Nepenthebiont Diptera:
 Aedes brevitibia
 several Chironomidae
 Corethrella calathicola
 Culex hewitti
 Culex coerulescens
 Culex navalis
 several Dasyhelea species (D. ampullariae, D. biseriata and others)
 Dolichopodidae
 Endonepenthia
 Nepenthosyrphus
 Toxorhynchites indicus
 Tripteroides nepenthis
 Tripteroides tenax
 Uranotaenia moultoni

See also
 Tripteroides sp. No. 2
 Phytotelmata

References